William "Bubba" Kennedy (born 27 January 1969) is an Australian former professional rugby league footballer who played for the Balmain Tigers.

Biography
Kennedy, an Indigenous Australian, played as a centre at Balmain for three seasons, from 1996 to 1998. He was the club's leading try scorer in each of his first two seasons and made 61 first-grade appearances in total. 

In 1997, Kennedy came off the bench and scored a try in NSW Country's 17-4 win over City in the annual City vs Country Origin representative fixture.

Since leaving Balmain he continued to play country rugby league into his late 40s. The teams he played for include Lithgow Workies, Bathurst Panthers, Orange Hawks, Cabonne United, Mudgee Dragons and the Blayney Bears.

His son, William Jr, is a member of the Cronulla Sharks NRL squad and his daughter, Kandy, played for the Roosters in the NRLW.

References

External links
William Kennedy at Rugby League project

1969 births
Living people
Australian rugby league players
Indigenous Australian rugby league players
Rugby league players from New South Wales
Rugby league centres
Balmain Tigers players
Country New South Wales Origin rugby league team players